The 1969 Colorado State Rams football team represented Colorado State University in the Western Athletic Conference during the 1969 NCAA University Division football season. In their eighth season under head coach Mike Lude, the Rams compiled a 4–6 record.

Schedule

Roster

References

Colorado State
Colorado State Rams football seasons
Colorado State Rams football